Pınar Ayhan (née Karakoç; born 28 March 1972) is a Turkish singer, most notable for participating in the Eurovision Song Contest 2000.

Music career

Eurovision
Ayhan first participated in the Turkish national finals in 1996, in a duet with Tüzmen with the song Var mısın söyle, and came in second. The second time was in 1997, with the song Sen nerede Ben orada, which did not receive a rank. Finally, in 2000, she, in collaboration with the group The S.O.S, participated with the song "Yorgunum Anla" and won. She represented Turkey in the Eurovision Song Contest 2000 in Stockholm, Sweden, and came in 10th place with 59 points, a rare top 10 placing for Turkey at the time.

After the Eurovision Song Contest of that year, she took part in the TRT show Günlük Rehber.

Discography
Duyuyor musun? (2012)

References

External links
Official website
 

1972 births
Living people
Eurovision Song Contest entrants of 2000
Eurovision Song Contest entrants for Turkey
Turkish pop singers
People from Diyarbakır
21st-century Turkish singers
21st-century Turkish women singers